UT System may refer to either of two state university systems:

 University of Tennessee system
 University of Texas System